Matthew John Spring (born 17 November 1979) is an English semi-professional footballer and coach who last played as a midfielder for  club Hitchin Town. He previously played for Luton Town, Leeds United, Watford, Sheffield United, Charlton Athletic, Leyton Orient, Wycombe Wanderers, St Neots Town and Hemel Hempstead Town.

Career

Luton Town
Spring started his career at Luton Town, making his debut as a half-time substitute in a 3–0 defeat to Bristol City on 27 September 1997. He went on to make 12 further appearances in the 1997–98 season. Spring established himself as a first-team regular in the 1998–99 season, making 54 appearances, scoring three goals. In the 2000–01 season, he made 51 appearances, scoring four goals, as Luton were relegated to the Third Division for the first time in 33 years. Luton bounced straight back in the 2001–02 season, finishing runners-up and were promoted back to the Second Division, with Spring making 43 appearances, scoring six goals. Spring was beset by injuries during the latter half of the 2003–04 season, causing him to miss the last three months of the season, restricting him to 30 appearances, scoring one goal. Spring's contract was due to expire at the end of the season and he looked set to leave Luton, with Championship clubs Nottingham Forest and Leeds United both interested in securing his services. In total he made 289 appearances for Luton, scoring 30 goals.

Leeds United
After leaving Luton, Spring was on the verge of joining Nottingham Forest and linking back up with former Luton manager Joe Kinnear until Leeds made a late bid to sign him. He was signed by newly appointed Leeds manager Kevin Blackwell on a Bosman transfer, as he re-modelled his newly relegated team. Spring described the turn of events as "a bit of a shock because I was lined up to go to Forest and I was pleased with that. Then a couple of days later Leeds came in with an offer. I had a decision to make but as soon as I saw Elland Road and thought about the atmosphere of 35,000 fans at every home game my mind was made up." Spring's first season in the Championship was an unhappy one, with a combination of injuries and personal problems restricting him to just 15 appearances and one goal against Ipswich Town.

Watford
As the 2005–06 season commenced Watford manager Adrian Boothroyd, who had worked with Spring when he was first team coach at Leeds, brought the midfielder to Vicarage Road to be part of his reshaped team for a transfer fee of £150,000. Spring scored on his debut, coming off the bench to put in a late third in a 3–1 victory over Burnley on 20 August 2005. As Boothroyd's team flew high in the Championship, Spring, a regular in the team, scored seven further goals from central midfield by the end of January. However, he did not score again until Watford reached the play-offs in May, when he scored the third goal in the 3–0 victory over Crystal Palace in the first leg of the semi-final. Spring played in the 3–0 Championship play-off final win over Leeds United at the Millennium Stadium, with Watford earning promotion to the Premier League.

During Watford's Premiership campaign, Spring's first team opportunities were limited after falling down the pecking order behind new signing Damien Francis and Al Bangura at Vicarage Road. As a result, he made only nine appearances for the club during the first half of the 2006–07 season.

Return to Luton Town
On 18 January 2007, after struggling to establish himself in the first team at Watford, Spring rejoined Luton on a two-and-a-half-year contract for a transfer fee of £200,000 (rising to £300,000). His first game since returning to the club came on 30 January in the 1–0 away defeat to Coventry City. At the end of the season, Luton were relegated to League One after two seasons in the Championship, with Spring making 14 appearances, scoring one goal. During the 2007–08 season, Spring made 54 appearances, scoring 12 goals, as Luton were relegated again to League Two.

On 31 July 2008, Spring joined Championship club Sheffield United on a season-long loan deal, with a view to a permanent move. He made his debut for the club on 13 August in the first round of the League Cup, a 3–1 victory at home over Port Vale. Injuries initially hampered his time at Bramall Lane, but by October, he began to feature regularly for the first team, scoring his first goal for the club on 25 November, a 3–1 defeat at home to Wolverhampton Wanderers.

On 9 January 2009, Spring was released from his loan deal with Sheffield United to allow him to seek a permanent move elsewhere, as agreed before the loan commenced.

Charlton Athletic
On 9 January 2009, Spring joined Championship club Charlton Athletic from Luton on an 18-month contract for an undisclosed fee. He scored his first goal for the club on 17 January, a 4–1 away defeat to Sheffield Wednesday. He scored his second goal just ten days later in a 1–0 win over rivals Crystal Palace in only his third game for his new employers. Spring finished the 2008–09 season making 13 appearances, scoring two goals, as Charlton were relegated to League One.

Spring failed to score in 15 appearances for Charlton during the 2009–10 season. Charlton chose not to offer Spring a new contract and so he left the club at the end of the season.

Leyton Orient
On 30 June 2010, Spring signed a two-year contract with League One club Leyton Orient. He made his debut for the club on 7 August, a 2–1 defeat away to Yeovil Town. Spring scored his first goal for Leyton Orient in a 3–2 defeat away to Notts County. He finished the 2010–11 season making 50 appearances, scoring two goals.

During the 2011–12 season, Spring scored his first goal on 12 November 2011, a 3–0 win over Bromley in the FA Cup. He scored his first league goal of the season on 31 December, a 1–0 win over his former employers and League One leaders Charlton. He finished the season making 45 appearances, scoring five goals. Spring was not offered a new contract by Leyton Orient and left the club at the end of the season.

Wycombe Wanderers
On 2 July 2012, it was announced that Spring had signed a two-year contract with Wycombe Wanderers. He arrived as one of five new signings after a transfer embargo was lifted from the club. Spring made his debut for the club on 11 August, a 1–0 away defeat to former club Watford. His first and only goal for Wycombe during the 2012–13 season came on 3 November, a 4–1 away defeat to Crewe Alexandra in the FA Cup. Spring ended the season making 29 appearances for Wycombe.

Spring made only eight appearances for Wycombe during the 2013–14 season, failing to score in any of them. He was among a number of players released at the end of the season having fallen out of favour with Gareth Ainsworth.

St Neots Town
Following his release by Wycombe Wanderers, Spring signed for Southern League Premier Division club St Neots Town in August 2014.

After a re-shuffle of the coaching staff early in the 2014–15 season, Spring was appointed player-assistant manager.

Despite playing an important role in the St Neots Town team that made the Southern Premier Division play-off final, Spring was one of several players released by the club at the end of the 2014–15 season.

Hemel Hempstead Town and Hitchin Town
After his release from St Neots Town, Spring moved up a division to sign with National League South club Hemel Hempstead Town in June 2015.

Spring signed a dual registration deal with Southern League Premier Division club Hitchin Town on 6 March 2017, scoring on his debut later that day in a 2–1 victory at home to Cirencester Town, having entered the match as a substitute. He re-signed for Hitchin on dual registration on 23 March 2018. Spring signed for Hitchin permanently as a player-coach on 24 May on a one-year contract.

Rivalry
Spring is one of the few players to have played for both Luton and their arch-rivals Watford. On 10 September 2002, he scored a 30-yard goal for Luton in a 2–1 victory over Watford in the League Cup, the first meeting of the two clubs for over three years.

Career statistics

Honours
Luton Town
Football League Third Division runner-up: 2001–02

Watford
Football League Championship play-offs: 2005–06

Individual
Luton Town Young Player of the Season: 1997–98

References

External links
Matthew Spring profile at the Hitchin Town F.C. website

1979 births
Living people
Sportspeople from Harlow
English footballers
Association football midfielders
Watford F.C. players
Leeds United F.C. players
Leyton Orient F.C. players
Luton Town F.C. players
Sheffield United F.C. players
Charlton Athletic F.C. players
Wycombe Wanderers F.C. players
St Neots Town F.C. players
Hemel Hempstead Town F.C. players
Hitchin Town F.C. players
English Football League players
Premier League players
Southern Football League players
National League (English football) players